Big Crazy Family Adventure follows the Kirkby family as they travel from British Columbia to Ladakh, India (more than 13,000 miles), by every mode of transportation except planes.

Episodes

The reality show has one season with nine episodes. The original run goes from June 2015 to August 2015.

Season 1 (2015)

Notes

References

External links
 

Travel Channel original programming
2015 American television series debuts
2015 American television series endings